Asuman "Asu" Özdağlar (born December 16, 1974) is a Turkish academic.

Early life
She was born to İsmail Özdağlar and Zahide Özdağlar on December 16, 1974. Her father İsmail Özdağlar was a former Minister of State, between December 13, 1983 and January 15, 1985 in the 45th government of Turkey, who was convicted and jailed of misuse of ministerial powers.

Career
She studied in the Electrical Engineering department of the Middle East Technical University (METU) in Ankara and received a Bachelor's degree in 1996. She then continued her studies at the Massachusetts Institute of Technology (MIT) in the United States and received her PhD in 2003. She served as an assistant professor (2003), associate professor (2008) and professor (2012) in the same university. Her research areas include nonlinear and convex optimization, game theory, social and economic networks, distributed-optimization methods, and network optimization and control. In 2017, she was named the new head of the Department of Electrical Engineering and Computer Science (EECS) at MIT. Her predecessor Anantha Chandrakasan says: "Professor Ozdaglar is an inspiring researcher and has emerged as a true leader in the areas of optimization theory and algorithms, game theory, and networks."

Personal life 
Asuman Ozdaglar is married to economist Daron Acemoğlu.

References

Living people
1974 births
Middle East Technical University alumni
Turkish electronics engineers
MIT School of Engineering alumni
MIT School of Engineering faculty
Turkish expatriates in the United States
Turkish engineering academics
Expatriate academics in the United States
Turkish women academics
Turkish academics